Theobald Johannes Krüper, sometimes known as Theodor   (1829–1921) was a German ornithologist and entomologist who worked mainly in the Balkans.
He was a student at the University of Berlin and a friend of Otto Staudinger .

He was later the curator of the zoological collection of the natural history museum in Athens. He collected insects from Turkey, Greece and Bulgaria for the collections in Athens. He also sold collections to the dealerships "Otto Staudinger - Andreas Bang-Haas" and Wilhelm Schlüter from which they were sold on to several institutions including Museum für Naturkunde in Berlin and the now Slovak National Museum in Bratislava.

Krüper's nuthatch (Sitta krueperi) was named for him by August von Pelzeln.

The millipede genus Krueperia Verhoeff, 1900 was named for him by Karl Wilhelm Verhoeff

References

Hesselbart, G.; Oorschot, H. van & Wagener, S. 1995 ''Die Tagfalter der Türkei unter Berücksichtigung der angrenzenden Länder.- Bocholt, Selbstverlag S. Wagener.

German lepidopterists
1829 births
1917 deaths